Ellsworth Fredricks (June 2, 1904 – August 16, 1993) was an American cinematographer. He was nominated for an Academy Award in the category Best Cinematography for the film Sayonara. Fredericks died in August 1993 in San Marcos, California, at the age of 89.

Selected filmography 
 Sayonara (1957)
 The Scorpio Letters (1967)

References

External links 

1904 births
1993 deaths
People from the Bronx
American cinematographers